is a Sonic the Hedgehog-themed party game developed and published by Sega for the Dreamcast in 2000. The game plays like a board game much in the same vein as Nintendo's Mario Party series, with up to four players moving their characters across a game board filled with a variety of spaces which can trigger different events. Some spaces will launch minigames that pit the players against each other in short competitive events.

Sega contracted Hudson Soft, the developers of Mario Party, to assist with development. For the game's graphics, they used the same cel shading technique used in their earlier game Jet Set Radio (2000). An online multiplayer mode was planned, but it was pulled so the game could launch in time for the 2000 holiday season. Although critics praised the graphics, the game's excessive load times and poorly explained, overly complex minigames were found to be significantly detrimental to the overall experience. Critics classified Sonic Shuffle as an inferior clone of Mario Party.

Gameplay

Sonic Shuffle is a party game for up to four players, playing like a board game in a similar fashion to the Mario Party series. The game is set in a dream world called "Maginaryworld", where a fairy asks Sonic the Hedgehog, Tails, Knuckles the Echidna, and Amy Rose to retrieve "Precioustones" to help her save Maginaryworld from Void, the game's villain. The players can choose to play as one of these four characters, or Big the Cat, E-102 Gamma, Super Sonic, and a Chao if unlocked later. Each character has unique abilities they can use to traverse the game boards.

Players take turns moving across the board in an effort to collect the most Precioustones; this is done by picking cards and moving the amount of spaces specified on it. Each player is dealt seven cards at a time, and their deck is visible on their personal VMU screen in their controller, keeping it a secret from other players. When it is a player's turn to move, they can choose to play a card from their hand, or play a random card from another player's hand. There is also a card which can be used to steal cards, swap hands with another player, or move one to seven spaces as decided by a short slot machine style game. Finally, there is a card that will summon Doctor Eggman, who will steal the player's rings or swap their position on the board with another player.

There are a variety of different spaces on the board. The most common spaces increase or subtract the player's ring count. Rings can be used to purchase power-ups in the form of "forcejewels" at special shop spaces. These stones can give the player numerous advantages, such as selecting more than one card in one turn or teleporting to other players' positions. Battle spaces pit the player that lands on the space in a short card game against an enemy. There is also always one space that harbors a Precioustone. When one of these is collected by a player, another one is placed on the board. The goal of each game is to collect the most Precioustones.

Finally there are minigame spaces. These spaces will launch a random minigame with either all the players, or just the player that landed on the space. The solo minigames are story-like sequences where the player must answer a question to win rings or gems, or lose them if answered wrong. The minigames that involve all the players come in a wide variety. Some are free-for-all games, while others pit the players against each other in two-versus-two or one-versus-three situations.

Development and release 
Sonic Shuffle was developed by Sega, with assistance from the Hudson Soft team behind Mario Party (1998), and supervision from Sonic Team. Most sources attributed Sega as the developer although some attributed the game to Sega's internal development team Smilebit. Smilebit had previously developed Jet Set Radio (2000) for the Dreamcast which was well regarded for its cel shaded visuals. Sega used the same cel shading techniques in Sonic Shuffle.

Sega revealed that a Sonic Adventure spin-off was in development alongside Sonic Adventure 2 in October 1999. The game was revealed in the June 2000 issue of Electronic Gaming Monthly (EGM) with the tentative title Sonic Square, shortly before the E3 trade fair that year. Sega had planned to reveal information about Sonic Adventure 2 to EGM for the issue, but decided the game was not ready to be shown, and shared Sonic Square instead. Support for online multiplayer through SegaNet was planned, it was ultimately cut so the game could ship ahead of the 2000 holiday season. Sonic Shuffle was released for the Dreamcast in North America on November 14, 2000, in Japan on December 21, and in Europe on March 9, 2001. The game was expected to appear in the 2002 compilation Sonic Mega Collection, but was ultimately not included.

Reception

Critics were quick to identify Sonic Shuffle as an inferior clone of Mario Party. They found the minigames to be overly complex, poorly explained, and generally not as enjoyable as those in Nintendo's flagship party series. Both GameSpot and Eurogamer felt as though the minigames were an afterthought, only appearing sparingly whereas in Mario Party they were central to the experience. GameSpot noted that it was possible to play through an entire game without ever playing a minigame, and felt that they were "a test of who can decipher the needlessly bewildering gameplay first". IGN complained about needing to land on certain tiles to play the minigames. Official Dreamcast Magazine (UK) argued that the minigames interfered with the main board game. GameSpy felt that they were inconsistent in quality, and wished there had been an option to turn them off. The long load times when transitioning between the main game board, the minigames, and other scenes was another common complaint. GameSpot wrote: "The combination of the unbearable load times, the smattering of minigames, and the poor minigame design make Sonic Shuffle a boring diversion at best." Eurogamer felt that Samba de Amigo (1999) was a better party game.

Most reviewers praised the colorful and cartoon styling of the cel shaded graphics. GameRevolution praised the environment textures and felt the graphics were of the same high quality as Jet Set Radio. However, the graphics were not enough to convince critics. Eurogamer wrote that the visuals and audio were "deceptively good", hiding the bad gameplay underneath. Edge appreciated the visuals, but wrote that "ultimately, the game is dull. Under the dark shadow of Sonic Adventure 2, this tepid, diluted affair will have difficulty proving itself, even to franchise stalwarts". Official Dreamcast Magazine (UK) and its American counterpart both felt that the game was more fun with human players rather than computer-controlled opponents, and complained about the lack of online support. Game Revolution agreed, finding it boring waiting for computer players in single-player mode. Official Dreamcast Magazine (US) felt that with more development time and support from Sonic Team, the game could have been saved.

Notes

References

External links
 

2000 video games
Digital board games
Dreamcast games
Dreamcast-only games
Multiplayer and single-player video games
Party video games
Sega video games
Sonic the Hedgehog spin-off games
Video games about dreams
Video games about parallel universes
Video games scored by Yoshitaka Hirota
Video games with cel-shaded animation
Video games developed in Japan